A partial lunar eclipse took place on Tuesday, November 29, 1955 with an umbral eclipse magnitude of 0.11899. A partial lunar eclipse happens when the Earth moves between the Sun and the Full Moon, but they are not precisely aligned. Only part of the Moon's visible surface moves into the dark part of the Earth's shadow. A partial lunar eclipse occurs when the Earth moves between the Sun and Moon but the three celestial bodies do not form a straight line in space. When that happens, a small part of the Moon's surface is covered by the darkest, central part of the Earth's shadow, called the umbra. The rest of the Moon is covered by the outer part of the Earth's shadow called the penumbra. It was the second of two lunar eclipses in 1955, first being the penumbral lunar eclipse on June 5.

Visibility

Related lunar eclipses

Lunar year series

Half-Saros cycle
A lunar eclipse will be preceded and followed by solar eclipses by 9 years and 5.5 days (a half saros). This lunar eclipse is related to two partial solar eclipses of Solar Saros 122.

See also
List of lunar eclipses
List of 20th-century lunar eclipses

Notes

External links

1955-11
1955 in science
November 1955 events